Decimus Junius Brutus Scaeva was a Roman politician and military man who served as a legate in 293 BC in the army of the consul Spurius Carvilius Maximus and as Roman consul in 292 BC.

Bibliography
 

3rd-century BC Roman consuls